Masatora Kawano (川野 将虎, born 23 October 1998) is a Japanese racewalking athlete. In 2021, he represented Japan at the 2020 Summer Olympics in Tokyo, finishing in 6th place in the men's 50 kilometres walk and setting a season best.

Kawano won a silver medal at the 2022 World Athletics Championships in the 35 km race in an Asian record time of 2:23:15.

References

External links
 

 

1998 births
Living people
Japanese male racewalkers
Athletes (track and field) at the 2020 Summer Olympics
Olympic athletes of Japan
Sportspeople from Miyazaki Prefecture
Universiade medalists in athletics (track and field)
Universiade gold medalists for Japan
Universiade silver medalists for Japan
World Athletics Championships athletes for Japan
World Athletics Championships medalists
21st-century Japanese people